Kinofilm is an animation studio founded in Los Angeles, California in 1996 by Russian immigrant Mikhail Shindel, a former producer at Acme Filmworks. In 1997, the studio was contracted to produce Cartoon Network's original series Mike, Lu & Og. The studio is still open, producing animated commercials and music videos. 

Kinofilm Studios is based in Los Angeles, California, which is also where it was founded.

Works
Mike, Lu & Og (1999-2001)

External links
Official website

American animation studios
Mass media companies established in 1996
Companies based in Los Angeles County, California
1996 establishments in California